María Chiquinquirá Delgado Díaz (born August 17, 1972 in Maracaibo, Venezuela) is a Venezuelan TV host, model, and actress. She was a co-host of Mira Quien Baila on the Univision network in the United States. Prior to that, she was the host of ¡Despierta América!, the morning show on Univision, from 2010 until 2012.

Biography
Named after the Virgen de Chiquinquirá, Delgado grew up in a devout Roman Catholic family in Maracaibo, Venezuela. Delgado was first runner-up in the 1990 Miss Venezuela beauty pageant and has appeared in several soap operas and hosted a number of programs on Venezuelan television. From 1991 until 1999, she was married to singer and actor Guillermo Dávila, with whom she has a daughter, actress María Elena Dávila. From 2004 until 2010, she was married to Venezuelan television host Daniel Sarcos, with whom she also has a daughter. Delgado has been dating Univision news anchor Jorge Ramos since 2011.

Delgado recently launched her own fashion apparel line in collaboration with David Lerner.  It is available at ChiquiDelgado.com as well as at select boutiques and department stores.

Filmography

TV shows host

TV series 
 Calypso, 1999
 María Rosa, búscame una esposa, 2000
 Mambo y canela, 2002
 Cosita Rica, 2003
 High Seas, 2019

Movies
 Pimp Bullies, Victimas de un Prostíbulo", 2011 Director Alejandro Peña
 Cuento sin Hadas'', 2011 Director Sergio Briones

External links 
 Chiquinquirá Delgado Official web site
 
 Chiquinquira Delgado Height

References

1972 births
Living people
People from Maracaibo
Venezuelan television personalities
Venezuelan telenovela actresses
Venezuelan beauty pageant winners
Venezuelan film actresses